LEF (born Lorenzo Esposito Fornasari; 20 November 1977) is an Italian vocalist, record producer and film score composer. He worked with Bill Laswell, Lisa Gerrard, Serj Tankian from System of a Down, Elisa, Ben Harper, Hamid Drake, Nils Petter Molvær, Eivind Aarset, Jamie Saft, Pat Mastelotto from King Crimson, Eraldo Bernocchi, Colin Edwin from Porcupine Tree, Markus Stockhausen, Kenneth Kapstad from Motorpsycho, Tony Wakeford, Trevor Dunn, Giovanni Lindo Ferretti, Raiz, Ambrogio Sparagna, Faraualla, Enrico Gabrielli, Sigillum S, Ephel Duath, Gianluca Petrella, Fabrizio Puglisi, Ståle Storlokken.

History 
Singer-composer Lorenzo Esposito Fornasari has made his mark as a singer and producer through a series of releases, including Obake's Draugr, Seven Mutations and their 2011 self-titled debut, Owls’ The Night Stays, O.R.k.'s Inflamed Rides, Soul of an Octopus and Ramagehead, Somma's 23 Wheels of Dharma and Berserk's 2013 self-titled debut. "Fornasari’s vocals are astonishing powerful, morphing between an urbane Sylvian-like drawl to a cracked-gravel growl oozing with a creeping malevolence. That theatrically evokes the dystopian pronouncements interleaving Bowie’s Outside" – Sid Smith, PROG magazine UKOver the last decade, LEF performed in prestigious festivals and theatre stages worldwide such as the Wave-Gotik-Treffen in Leipzig with the band Owls (Tony Wakeford, Eraldo Bernocchi, Lef) Asymmetry Festival in Poland with the band Obake, with Giovanni Lindo Ferretti at Teatro Vittoria in Roma, the Teatro Grande in Brescia, the Cappella Paolina del Quirinale, the Teatro di Correggio, the Teatro Comunale Modena, Bologna in Piazza Santo Stefano, the Teatro Piccolo Regio in Torino, with Somma at the Teatro Dal Verme di Milano, and singing Contemporary Opera at venues like the Teatro Comunale in Bologna, and finally the Teatro Comunale in Ferrara.
In 2004 he started working together with Eraldo Bernocchi with whom produced the album "Unisono" in collaboration with Bill Laswell. During the same year, Fornasari gave birth to the "Vaga L’Am" project with Quintorigo, Giovanni Lindo Ferretti, Enrico Gabrielli and Transgender.
In 2007 he took part in the Somma project with Eraldo Bernocchi, Bill Laswell, Raiz, Hamid Drake, Nils Petter Molvær, Faraualla and seven Tibetan Monks.
In 2008, again with Eraldo Bernocchi, he co-produced the remix album for Ephel Duath's "Pain Remixes the Known".
In 2009 he wrote soundtracks for "La torre riflette", a video installation on the Due Torri in Bologna. 
In the same year he produced "Costituto" with Bernocchi, Markus Stockhausen and Giovanni Lindo Ferretti, a 700 years celebration album for the Costituto of Siena.
In 2010 he disclosed an approach to the bel canto as he made his debut in Nino Rota's "Il Principe Porcaro" opera at the Teatro Comunale in Ferrara.
Finally and more recently, Fornasari is a member of the trio Owls, with Eraldo Bernocchi and Tony Wakeford, which played their opening concert at the Wave-Gotik-Treffen in Leipzig in 2011.
In 2012 he won the Genova Film Festival award with his "Cose Naturali" soundtracks.
Fornasari is also a member of Obake with Bernocchi, Massimo Pupillo and Balázs Pándi. In 2012 Trevor Dunn is on tour with the band subbing for Pupillo.
Obake is 6th in the list of 2011's 50 most important releases in Rock-A-Rolla magazine. In 2012 Lef wrote music for Saga, a Giovanni Lindo Ferretti's opera with 14 horses on stage.
In 2013 he started with Lorenzo Feliciati the band Berserk! (RareNoiseRecords April 2013). Pat Mastelotto, Jamie Saft, Gianluca Petrella, Eivind Aarset, Cristiano Calcagnile, Fabrizio Puglisi, Sandro Satta and Simone Cavina took part in this studio album as well. This music is part to the soundtrack composed by Lef for the feature film "La città senza notte" by Italian director Alessandra Pescetta.
In 2013 the Sony Music released the Giovanni Lindo Ferretti's Saga CD, composed and produced by Lef.
In 2014 he produced "MUTATIONS" the Obake's 2nd album released through the RareNoiseRecords. 
In 2015 Lef, Pat Mastelotto from King Crimson, Colin Edwin from Porcupine Tree and Carmelo Pipitone from Marta Sui Tubi produced the album "INFLAMED RIDES" as O.R.k. In 2016 the Obake band produced the album Draugr. 
In 2017 he composed the score for The Asteroids, a feature film directed by Germano Maccioni. 
In 2017 he released with the band O.R.k. the album "Soul of an Octopus"(Rarenoise Records).
In 2019 he released with the band O.R.k. the album "Ramagehead" (Kscope), featuring Serj Tankian from System of a Down on the track "Black Blooms". The cover was designed by Adam Jones from Tool.
In 2021 he scored the Italia. Il fuoco, la cenere film by Céline Gailleurd and Olivier Bohler featuring Isabella Rossellini.
In 2002 he scored Amazonia. The last season featuring Ben Harper, an Amazon Prime original.
In 2023 he released with the band O.R.k. the album "Screamnasium" (Kscope) featuring Italian pop star Elisa Toffoli. The cover was designed by Adam Jones from Tool.

Discography

Albums 
 Transgender 2000, Transgender
 A dream Made of Water 2001, Transgender
 Etno Ambient Project 2002, Transgender
 Sen Soj TrumàS 2003, Transgender
 Litania 2004, Litania
 Unisono 2006, Ashes
 Mey Ark Vu 2007, Transgender
 Costituto 2009, Costituto with Stockhausen Bernocchi and Giovanni Lindo Ferretti (RareNoiseRecords)
 23 Wheels of Dharma 2010, Somma with Bill Laswell, Hamid Drake, Nils Petter Molvær, Eraldo Bernocchi, Raiz (RareNoiseRecords)
 The night stays 2011, Owls with Tony Wakeford and Eraldo Bernocchi (RareNoiseRecords)
 Untitled 2011, Obake with Eraldo Bernocchi, Massimo Pupillo, Balázs Pándi (RareNoiseRecords)
 Untitled 2013, "Berserk!" with Lorenzo Feliciati, Eivind Aarset, Gianluca Petrella, Jamie Saft, Pat Mastelotto
 Saga, il canto dei canti 2013, Giovanni Lindo Ferretti with Giovanni Lindo Ferretti
 Mutations 2015, Obake
 Inflamed rides 2015, "O.R.K." with Colin Edwin, Pat Mastelotto, Carmelo Pipitone
 Draugr 2016, Obake
 Hypersomniac 2016, LEF with Eivind Aarset, Bill Laswell, Kenneth Kapstad, Nils Petter Molvær, Ståle Storløkken and Rebecca Sneddon 
 Soul of An Octopus 2017, "O.R.K."
 Ramagehead 2019, "O.R.K."
 Italia. Il fuoco, la cenere 2022, LEF film score with vocals by Isabella Rossellini
 Screamnasium 2022, "O.R.K."

Productions/Remixes 
 Etno Ambient Project (remixes) 2002, Transgender
 Pain Remixes the Known 2007, Ephel Duath – Earache rec

Film, visual art and adverts scoring

Films 
 2010 Cose naturali, by Germano Maccioni, short
 2011 Morte per Acqua, by Alessandra Pescetta, short
 2013 Fedele alla linea, by Germano Maccioni, documentary
 2013 Alta via dei parchi, by Serena Tommasini Degna and Enrico Brizzi, documentary
 2015 The nightless city, by Alessandra Pescetta, feature film
 2017 Gli asteroidi, by Germano Maccioni, feature film
 2018 Fabio Mauri, Ritratto a luce solida, by Sky Art, Documentary film
 2021 Italia. Il fuoco, la cenere, By Céline Gailleurd / Olivier Bohler, Documentary film
 2021 Mad Chicken, by Moe Irvin, Short film
 2022 Amazonia. The last season, feat Ben Harper, Amazon Prime original Documentary film

Commercials 
Since 2005, Lef composed the score for over 80 commercials for many brands: Louis Vuitton, Varilux, Essilor, Bolon, Mutti, Romerquelle, Harmonie Mutuelle, Kodak, Minute Maid, Récré O'lé – Mont Blanc, Chevrolet, Imetec, Valfrutta, Valsoia, Well, Maya beauty Engineering, Tetley, Cofidis, Harry, Dasani, Ferrari, Vileda, Alexa, Barilla.

Visual art 
 2005 The sultan's dream, by Bruna Rotunno, video installation
 2008 Le donne del cinema, by Elisa Seravalli, video installation
 2009 La torre riflette, by Articolture, video installation
 2012 L'arte dell'assedio, by Elisa Seravalli, educational video
 2015 Non dobbiamo andare a farci ammazzare da stupidi, by Elisa Seravalli, video installation

References

External links
http://www.lefmusic.com
http://www.orkband.com/
http://www.obakeband.com
http://www.rarenoiserecords.com/
http://www.kscopemusic.com/

Living people
Italian male composers
RareNoiseRecords artists
1977 births
21st-century Italian male singers